The International School of Broward is a charter school in Hollywood, Florida, United States, that offers a two way immersion program with French and English. It was founded in 2007 by Dr. Jacqueline Hoy.

Notable alumni
Jonathan Isaac, forward for Orlando Magic

See also
 American School of Paris – An American international school in France

References

External links
Official site

International schools in Florida
Charter schools in Florida
Public high schools in Florida
Public middle schools in Florida
Buildings and structures in Hollywood, Florida
High schools in Broward County, Florida
Educational institutions established in 2007
2007 establishments in Florida